Ivory Coast sent a delegation to compete at the 2008 Summer Olympics in Beijing, China.

Athletics

Women

Key
Note–Ranks given for track events are within the athlete's heat only
Q = Qualified for the next round
q = Qualified for the next round as a fastest loser or, in field events, by position without achieving the qualifying target
NR = National record
N/A = Round not applicable for the event
Bye = Athlete not required to compete in round

Canoeing

Sprint

Qualification Legend: QS = Qualify to semi-final; QF = Qualify directly to final

Football

Men's tournament

Roster

Group play

Quarterfinals

Swimming

Men

Taekwondo

References

External links
 

Nations at the 2008 Summer Olympics
2008
Olympics